Kim Clijsters was the defending champion and successfully defended her title, by defeating Magdalena Maleeva 6–1, 6–2 in the final.

Seeds
The first two seeds received a bye into the second round.

Draw

Finals

Top half

Bottom half

References

External links
 Official results archive (ITF)
 Official results archive (WTA)

2002 Singles
SEAT Open - Singles
2002 in Luxembourgian sport